Elodie Lauten (October 20, 1950 – June 3, 2014) was a French-born American composer described as postminimalist or a microtonalist.

Biography
Born in Paris, France as Genevieve Schecroun, and educated in Paris at the Lycée Claude Monet, the Conservatoire (piano) and the Institut d’Etudes Politiques. Her father was Errol Parker (né Raphaël Schecroun), an Algerian-born jazz musician; her mother was a classical pianist.

Lauten was classically trained as a pianist since age 7. She contributed to the early punk-rock scene in Paris in 1975 and 1976.  After relocating to New York City, she received a Master's in composition from New York University where she studied Western composition with Dinu Ghezzo, and Indian classical music with Ahkmal Parwez. She became an American citizen in 1984. She received awards from the NEA, ASCAP, MTC, and the American Music Center, as well as chamber and orchestral commissions. 

A writer of operas, theater pieces, orchestral, chamber and instrumental music, she was recognized in North America and Europe as a pioneer of postminimalism and a force on the new music scene with over 20 releases on a number of labels including Lovely Music, Point/Polygram, 4-Tay, O.O. Discs, and New Tone (Italy).

Musical style
Lauten's music was always a combination of two contradictory streams, one a cloudy, beatless stasis derived from minimalism, the other a neoclassical attachment to tonal melody and ostinato. These two were present from the beginning of her recording career, the first in her Concerto for Piano and Orchestral Memory (1984), the second in her Sonata Ordinaire (1986) for piano.

Her 1987 opera The Death of Don Juan—feminist tract and Zen meditation combined—was one of the major postminimalist works of the 1980s; it was revived in April 2005 at Franklin Pierce College (in New Hampshire), directed by Robert Lawson. Her neoclassical tendency blossomed into a full neo-baroque idiom in her Deus ex Machina Cycle for voices and Baroque ensemble (1999). Variations On The Orange Cycle (1991, recorded by Lois Svard for Lovely Music in 1998) is one of the cloudier works, an improvisation in a Terry Riley-ish vein that was recorded and transcribed (as few of her piano works have been) for performance by others. Svard's recording of the work was included in Frank J. Oteri's "The Century List: 100 Reasons to Play This Century's Music", a list of 100 recommended recordings for classic radio programmers distributed at the 1998 Music Personnel in Public Radio conference and subsequently published in Chamber Music magazine in 1999.

Lauten's opera Waking in New York, written on poems by her late friend Allen Ginsberg, was presented by the New York City Opera VOX and Friends 2004, after being released on 4Tay in 2003. Smoothly suave but with a gentle rock beat, the work pioneered a mixture of genres by combining vocal soloists from three styles: classical, Broadway, and gospel. OrfReo, an opera for Baroque ensemble, was premiered at Merkin Hall by the Queen's Chamber Band, who also included Lauten's The Architect in their CD New Music Alive (Capstone, 2004). OrfReo was released on CD in December 2004 (Studio 21). In 2004, she was composer-in-residence at Hope College (in Michigan). Her Symphony 2001 was premiered in February 2003 by the SEM Orchestra in New York.

Lauten was the 2014 recipient of the Foundation for Contemporary Arts' Robert Rauschenberg Award.

Personal life
Genevieve adopted the name "Elodie" after moving to the United States and took the surname Lauten from her first husband. That marriage ended in divorce, as did her second, to Carl Karas. She had no children.

Death
Lauten died in Beth Israel Hospital, Manhattan, aged 63, from cancer.

Works

Chamber music
Links, solo flute, 2004
The Wish of the Quickening Moon, string quartet, 2003
Sex and Pre-Anti-Post Modernism, contrabass/voice, setting of text by Michael Andre, 2002
T.E.V.B. (The Elusive Virgin Bachelor), trio (piano, violin, cello), 2002
Space-Time Sextet, string sextet (3 violins, viola, cello, contrabass), 2001
Mantra, vocal sextet, 2001
American Dreamscape, solo piano, 2000
Lunaticity, Baroque ensemble, 1999
Prophecy, solo viola, 1999
Irrational Synergies, baritone, flute, clarinet, saxophone, cello; setting of poems by Gertrude Stein, Ezra Pound, E. E. Cummings, commissioned by The Lark Ascending, 1998
Discombobulations, electronic, electric guitar, flute, and soprano, lyrics by Steven Hall, 1997
Variations on the Orange Cycle, solo piano, 1991
Concerto for Piano and Orchestral Memory, piano, tape, synthesizer, cello, trombone, violin, viola, 1984

Dance
The Soundless Sound, electronic, 2004
She-Wolf, electronic (Fairlight computer), 1987
Oedipus Rex, electronic/computer (Fairlight), 1984

Operas and cycles
The Death of Don Juan, revision of 1985 opera, 2005
Orfreo, soprano, mezzo, countertenor, baritone, and Baroque orchestra: harpsichord, string quartet, oboe, flute, contrabass; libretto by Michael Andre, commissioned by Harpsichord Unlimited, 2004
Waking in New York, baritone, soprano, mezzo, full orchestra, libretto by Allen Ginsberg, 2004
Waking in New York, soprano, mezzo, baritone, string quartet, flute, contrabass, percussion, synthesizer, libretto by Allen Ginsberg, 1999
The Deus Ex Machina Cycle, two sopranos, baritone, harpsichord, string quartet, flute; libretto by, among others: Lauten, Rilke, Verlaine, Pascal, and Steven Hall, 1995
Existence, yenor, soprano, mezzo-soprano and narrator, piano, synthesizer, percussion; music and libretto by Lauten, 1990
The Death of Don Juan, computer generated tape, 4 sopranos, harpsichord, Trine (custom  lyre), cello, synthesizer, Grand Trine (custom harp); music and libretto by Lauten, 1985

Orchestral
Harmonic Protection Circle, 2003
Symphony 2001, 2000

Soundtracks
Crossroads Variations, solo piano, 2004
Harmonic Protection Circle 2004, synthesizer, electric guitar, percussion, contrabass, 2004
Harmonic Protection Circle 2003, Trine, electric guitar, 2003
The Mystery of the Elements, piano, electronic, 2002
S.O.S.W.T.C., electronic, 2001
Double X, electronic, voice, flute, 1999
Inscapes from Exile, electronic, 1995
Tronik Involutions, electronic, 1993
Remembrance of Things Past, electronic, cello, music for sound installation based on the writing of Marcel Proust, 1988
Untitled , 5 pieces for live Fairlight computer, electric violin, cello, Trine, piano; commissioned by the Lincoln Center Serious Fun Series, 1988
Blue Rhythms, piano and electronic, 1987
Krash Music, electronic, singers, 1986
Sonate Ordinaire, solo piano, 1986
Sonate Modale, piano and tape, 1985
Action Music, piano and sound environment, 1985
Music for the Trine, a custom-designed amplified lyre, electronic, Trine, voice, cello, 1985
Magnetic Fields, electronic, Trine, 1985
The Soundless Sound, electronic, 1984
The Enigma of a Lovely/Loveless Existence, concrete, Casiotone, voice, 1983
Piano Works, piano, concrete, synthesizer, 1983

Discography
Tronik Involutions: From the Gaia Cycle Matrix a Work in Umi (1995/1996). Studio 21/OO Discs: 7108. Composed and performed by Elodie Lauten.
The Deus Ex Machina Cycle: New music for voices and Baroque ensemble (1999). 4Tay Inc.: CD 4013.
Inscapes from Exile (2000). Robi Droli/Newtone: 7004.

References

External links
 
 
 
 
 
 

1950 births
2014 deaths
20th-century classical composers
21st-century classical composers
French emigrants to the United States
American women classical composers
American classical composers
French women classical composers
Deaths from cancer in New York (state)
People from Manhattan
Pupils of La Monte Young
Musicians from Paris
Steinhardt School of Culture, Education, and Human Development alumni
Women in electronic music
21st-century American composers
20th-century American women musicians
20th-century American composers
20th-century French composers
21st-century French composers
21st-century American women musicians
20th-century women composers
21st-century women composers
20th-century French women musicians